The Harder They Fall is a 2021 American Western film directed by Jeymes Samuel (in his feature directorial debut), who co-wrote the screenplay with Boaz Yakin. The film stars Jonathan Majors, Idris Elba, Zazie Beetz, Regina King, Delroy Lindo, Lakeith Stanfield, RJ Cyler, Danielle Deadwyler, Edi Gathegi, and Deon Cole. It is one of few Westerns whose principal cast members are all black. Its characters are loosely based on real cowboys, lawmen, and outlaws of the nineteenth-century American West.

The Harder They Fall premiered at the BFI London Film Festival on October 6, 2021. It received a limited release on October 22, 2021, prior to streaming on Netflix on November 3. The film received generally positive reviews for its ensemble cast as well as Samuel's direction and score.

Plot

11-year-old Nat Love is eating dinner with his parents when Rufus Buck and his associate Cortez arrive. Nat's father begs Buck for forgiveness but Buck guns down Nat's parents and then carves a cross into his forehead.

Twenty years later, Love finds and kills Cortez. Meanwhile, his partners, sharpshooter Bill Pickett and quick draw Jim Beckwourth, ambush the Crimson Hood gang and steal their haul from a recent bank robbery. The lone survivor tells them the $25,000 they have stolen belongs to Buck. Love travels to meet his former lover Mary Fields, who runs a chain of saloons. Pickett brings news of the heist to Love.

Buck's gang, led by Trudy Smith and Cherokee Bill, forcefully free Buck from a train leaving from Yuma Territorial Prison. They reveal Buck has been pardoned, and they have been paid to kill the corrupt U.S. Army soldiers guarding the prison car. After slaughtering the soldiers, Buck and his gang arrive in their former stronghold of Redwood City, now run by Buck's associate, Sheriff Wiley Escoe. Learning that Escoe has used the position to profit at the expense of the town, Buck brutally pistol whips him and orders him to leave town. Buck gathers the townspeople and after killing a naysayer, demands that they raise $50,000 to save Redwood, threatening to kill and burn the property of any who resist.

U.S. Marshal Bass Reeves arrests Love after a standoff in a saloon. However, Reeves reveals to Love that Buck has been released, and he offers him a chance for revenge. Love's gang, accompanied by Fields and her friend and enforcer, Cuffee, arrive and insist on joining. They encounter Escoe, who tells them Buck has returned to Redwood. Fields volunteers to scout Redwood under the cover of offering to buy Smith's saloon. Love proposes marriage to Fields, but she turns him down.

When Fields arrives in Redwood, Smith takes her prisoner and beats her. Love's gang arrives, and Love joins Fields in captivity to save her life. Smith has Love beaten, and he in turn asks Buck to release Fields. Buck demands Love return the money he stole plus $10,000 as 'interest', requiring him to rob a bank in a white town. Love and Cuffee rob the bank without killing anyone and escape. However, the group recognizes that Buck is unlikely to release Fields willingly, so they devise a plan to rig a decoy wagon with dynamite.

They enter Redwood and the decoy wagon is destroyed, killing some of Buck's gang. Love prepares to hand over the money, but is interrupted by Cherokee Bill preparing to shoot him in the back. Beckwourth intervenes, challenging Bill to a quick draw showdown. Bill shoots and kills Beckwourth before he can finish counting down, causing a gunfight to erupt. Love, Reeves, Pickett, and Cuffee kill most of Buck's gang, and the money is destroyed in another explosion. Escoe infiltrates Buck's house but is killed by Buck, while Pickett and Love are wounded.

Fields is freed by Cuffee and pursues Smith, who she defeats in a hand-to-hand fight. Pickett is shot in the back by Bill, who is subsequently killed by Cuffee in a quick draw confrontation. Love finds Buck, who is unwilling to defend himself. Buck reveals that they are half-brothers, and that their father was once an abusive outlaw who killed his first wife (Buck's mother) when she tried to protect her son. After leaving Buck, their father eventually repented and married another woman and had Nat. He further indicates that driving Love to outlawry was his true act of revenge against their father. Love reluctantly kills Buck and closes his eyes out of respect.

Love and his companions bury Pickett and Beckwourth, alongside another grave marked "Nat Love". Cuffee joins Reeves as a deputy. Cuffee and Reeves ride off in one direction and Love and Fields in another. A woman holding a bowler hat, presumably Trudy Smith, looks at them from a distance.

Cast

Additionally, Michael Beach and Sadiqua Bynum appear as Nat Love's parents in the opening scene.

Production
The film's original working title was The Notorious Nine. The film was announced in July 2019, when Jonathan Majors was cast to star in it. Musician Jeymes Samuel co-wrote and directed the film. Idris Elba would join in November, and Jay-Z, who would produce the film, was announced to be writing original music for the film. By September 2020, Zazie Beetz, Lakeith Stanfield, Delroy Lindo and Regina King would be among new cast members added to the film.

Filming had been scheduled to begin in March 2020 in Santa Fe, New Mexico, but was delayed as a result of the COVID-19 pandemic. Cynthia Erivo, Wesley Snipes and Sterling K. Brown, who were initially cast, had to exit due to the delays caused by the pandemic. Filming commenced in September 2020, but was paused on October 15 after a background actor tested positive for COVID-19.

Release
The film had its world premiere at the BFI London Film Festival on October 6, 2021. It also screened at the Montclair Film Festival on October 22, 2021. It received a limited release on October 22, 2021, prior to streaming on Netflix on November 3.

Music 

An original soundtrack and a film score composed by Jeymes Samuel, were released on October 29, 2021 and January 14, 2022, respectively.

Reception 
On review aggregator Rotten Tomatoes, 87% of 181 critics gave the film a positive review, with an average rating of 7.5/10. The website's critics consensus reads: "It isn't as bold and fearless as its characters, but The Harder They Fall fills its well-worn template with style, energy, and a fantastic cast." On Metacritic, the film has a weighted average score of 68 out of 100 based on 41 critics, indicating "generally favorable reviews".

Accolades

References

External links
 
 Official screenplay

2021 films
2021 action drama films
2021 directorial debut films
2021 Western (genre) films
2020s American films
2020s English-language films
American action drama films
American Western (genre) films
English-language Netflix original films
Film productions suspended due to the COVID-19 pandemic
Films produced by Lawrence Bender
Films produced by Jay-Z
Films shot in New Mexico
Films with screenplays by Boaz Yakin
Overbrook Entertainment films